Amjed Ullah Khan (born 23 September 1972) is Ex Corporator, 35 Azampura Division (GHMC) and youth leader of Majlis Bachao Tehreek (MBT) in Hyderabad in the Indian state of  Telangana, He is controversial due to his views and as a main opponent of All India Majlis-e-Ittehadul Muslimeen (AIMIM).

Amjed Ullah Khan is the son of 5 time MLA Amanullah Khan. He rose to fame when he intervened in the kidnap and rape case of a Muslim girl at TRR College. Satya Prakash Singh had kidnapped the girl and held her prisoner for 17 months, during which time he repeatedly raped her. When parents of the victim reported the crime, the local police took no action because Singh's brother is a prominent lawyer. AUK led an agitation movement against the police and Singh, and, joined by thousands of youngsters, brought heavy pressure on the police.

AUK is the sole exponent behind Majlis Bachao Tehreek political Operations.

See also
 Majlis Bachao Tehreek
 Amanullah Khan (politician)

References

External links
 
 

1972 births
Indian political party founders
Living people
21st-century Indian politicians
Politicians from Hyderabad, India
Majlis Bachao Tehreek politicians